Richard Jefferson Eaton (1806 – 27 July 1847) was a British Conservative politician.

Eaton was elected Conservative Member of Parliament for Cambridgeshire at the 1835 general election and held the seat until 1847 when he did not seek re-election.

References

External links
 

UK MPs 1835–1837
UK MPs 1837–1841
UK MPs 1841–1847
Conservative Party (UK) MPs for English constituencies
1806 births
1847 deaths